The 2011–12 Kansas Jayhawks men's basketball team represented the University of Kansas in the 2011–12 NCAA Division I men's basketball season, which was the Jayhawks' 114th basketball season. As in every season since 1955–56, the team played its home games at Allen Fieldhouse on its campus in Lawrence, Kansas, US. After defeating rival Missouri on February 25, the Jayhawks clinched their 8th straight outright Big 12 championship. After defeating North Carolina, the Jayhawks advanced to their 14th Final Four in school history, where they defeated Ohio State 64-62 in the national semifinals. On April 2, Kansas faced Kentucky for the national title, losing to the favored Wildcats. Kansas had played both of its Final Four opponents during the regular season, losing to Kentucky on November 15 and defeating Ohio State on December 10. They finished the season with a 32–7 overall record, and 16–2 in Big 12 play.

Pre–season

Departures
The Jayhawks lost graduating seniors Brady Morningstar, Tyrel Reed, and Mario Little. Juniors and twin brothers Markieff Morris and Marcus Morris, plus freshman Josh Selby, departed early to enter the 2011 NBA draft. On June 23, Markieff and Marcus were drafted #13 and #14, respectively, in the first round of the draft, while Selby went in the second. Royce Woolridge also announced on April 16, 2011 his intent to transfer to another school for the following year, signing with Washington State.

Recruiting
On October 12, 2010, 4-star point guard Naadir Tharpe signed a letter of intent to join the Jayhawks as a freshman for the 2011–12 season. The 6-foot prep all-star chose Kansas over offers from Oklahoma, Minnesota, Boston College, Marquette, NC State, UNLV and others. He was previously committed to Providence.  On January 24, 2011, combo-guard Christian Garrett joined the team as a walk-on. He was also recruited by NC State, Auburn, Alabama, and others.  On April 3, 2011, 5-star shooting guard Ben McLemore from St. Louis, Missouri, verbally committed to Kansas after the Next All-American Classic High-School All-Star Game, over offers from Missouri, Tennessee, Illinois, Arkansas, Purdue, and others.  On April 10, 2011, Canadian forward Braeden Anderson committed to the Jayhawks over Kentucky, Arizona, Memphis, and Missouri.  Jamari Traylor joined in May, while June saw the additions of Kevin Young and Merv Lindsay.

Eligibility
Three of Kansas' six recruits were declared ineligible for the 2011–12 season. Braeden Anderson was not approved to play by the Big 12 Conference due to their policy on partial qualifiers. Ben McLemore and Jamari Traylor were also declared ineligible but were able to practice with the team during the spring semester, and would be eligible to play in the 2012–13 season.

Class of 2011

|-
| colspan="7" style="padding-left:10px;" | Overall recruiting rankings:     Scout: 28     Rivals: 28       ESPN: 22 
|}
Transfers

|}

Roster

Schedule

|-
!colspan=12| Exhibition

|-
!colspan=12| Regular season

|-
!colspan=12| Big 12 tournament

|-
!colspan=12|NCAA tournament

Rankings

Awards
Bill Self
Big 12 Co-Coach of the Year
Naismith College Coach of the Year
Sporting News National Coach of the Year and Big 12 Coach of the Year
Adolph Rupp Cup

Thomas Robinson
1st Team All-American (Sporting News, USBWA, NABC, ESPN.com, AP, John R. Wooden)
ESPN.com National Player of the Year
Big 12 Player of the Year and 1st Team All-Big 12
Sporting News Big 12 Player of the Year
Associated Press Big 12 Player of the Year and 1st Team All-Big 12
4x Phillips 66 Big 12 Player of the Week (November 28, December 12, January 2, February 27) 

Tyshawn Taylor
1st Team All-Big 12
Associated Press 1st Team All-Big 12
2x Phillips 66 Big 12 Player of the Week (January 16, March 4)
Sporting News 3rd Team All-American
USBWA 3rd Team All-American
NABC All-District 8 First Team
Associated Press 3rd Team All-American

Jeff Withey
Big 12 Defensive Player of the Year
Big 12 All-Defensive Team and 3rd Team

References

Kansas Jayhawks men's basketball seasons
Kansas
Kansas
NCAA Division I men's basketball tournament Final Four seasons
Jay
Jay